Joseph Bol Chan was a politician from South Sudan and Member of Council of States of South Sudan who served as Speaker of Council of States of South Sudan.

Personal life 
He died in November 2021 at the age of 74.

References 

1940s births
2021 deaths
South Sudanese politicians
Members of the National Legislature (South Sudan)